The Myrmidon Club is a dining club elected from the members of Merton College, Oxford, and with a continuous history exceeding 150 years. Until recently, the club was single-sex, and an equivalent club for women, named the Myrmaids, was established following the college's decision to admit women students in 1980. It is now a mixed-gender society.

History

Founded in 1865, it is one of the handful of such clubs with an almost continuous existence from the second half of the 19th century. It once maintained private rooms on the High Street, but in common with most similar clubs it no longer has private accommodation.

Describing Lord Randolph Churchill's membership of the Club towards the end of the 1860s, T.H.S. Escott wrote:
"There is a certain monotony in the chronicle of the doings at these feasts. In all cases there are the same narratives of proctors' invasions, youthful concealments in coal-cellars, varied sometimes by the incarceration of indiscreet waiters in pantries or ice safes ; or encounters with proctors and bull-dogs, tempered by conflicts with the city police."

L. E. Jones in his memoir described a dinner which (as a member of Balliol) he attended as a guest in his first term. He drank 24 glasses of port, was rescued from the shrubbery and was carried to bed by his friends:
"The miseries of that spinning night and of the next day have preserved me for life from drunkenness ... Not even the killing of Hector by the Myrmidons, in Shakespeare's version of that tragedy, could have been, since it was swifter, so brutal a handling as I got from the Myrmidons of Merton. Yet, manners being manners, I wrote a note to say how much I had enjoyed myself."

Traditions
The club takes its name from the legendary warriors commanded by Achilles, as described in Homer's Iliad.

The Club has storage facilities in College, but in common with similar college dining societies is intermittently out of favour with the college authorities.

Its colours are purple, gold and silver. Members wear ties with stripes of these colours.

Popular references
The Club is thought to be the model for the Junta, the fictional club in Max Beerbohm's Zuleika Dobson, of which the Duke of Dorset was for some time the sole member. Beerbohm was himself Honorary Secretary of the Myrmidons.

Notable members
Max Beerbohm
Lennox Berkeley
George Binney
Brigadier Lorne Campbell VC
Lord Randolph Churchill
Sir George Clutton, HM Ambassador to Poland
John Edward Bernard Hill, MP for South Norfolk
Andrew Irvine
Sir Harold Kent, HM Procurator General and Treasury Solicitor
Sir George Mallaby 
Reginald Maudling
Airey Neave
Anthony Nuttall
Colin Sleeman, war crimes defence counsel and judge
Reginald Turner
Edward Vaizey
Angus Wilson

See also
 List of University of Oxford dining clubs

References

Merton College Register (1891-1989) (printed for private circulation, 1990)

External links
 A short account of the history of the Myrmidon Club (PDF 74k bytes)

Clubs and societies of the University of Oxford
Dining clubs